Cape ivy or  German ivy or parlor ivy or Italian ivy is probably:
Delairea odorata also known as Senecio mikanioides
but might also be:
Senecio macroglossus also known as Natal ivy or waxvine
Senecio angulatus (in Australia)

References